Tiny Dog Records is a British-based independent record label, located in  Shropshire, England.

Background
Founded in 1999, they have released original material by Flipron, Scott 4, Magic Car, The Billy Shinbone Show and The Rhynes.

Flipron is a psychedelic pop band from Glastonbury, England, United Kingdom. Their music has been likened to Tom Waits, Syd Barrett, The Kinks and XTC.

Scott 4 is an electronic band from London, who were previously signed to the major label V2 Records.

Magic Car are from Nottingham, England, and feature the Americana / folk rock songs of the actor and musician Phil Smeeton.

References

External links
Official website
Phil Smeeton

British record labels